Boxing gloves are cushioned gloves that fighters wear on their hands during boxing matches and practices. Unlike "fist-load weapons" (such as the ancient cestus) which were designed as a lethal weapon, modern boxing gloves are non-lethal, designed to protect both the opponent's head and the fighter's hand during a bout. Sparring and other forms of boxing training have their own specialized gloves.

History

Ancient Middle-Eastern and Egyptian depictions of boxing  showed contests where fighters had a band supporting the wrist. Early depictions of gloves in boxing date back to Minoan Crete . The use of hand protection in fighting contests undertaken for sport has been known since Ancient Greece. However, the gloves were very different from those of modern boxing, as was the sport itself. In Ancient Greece, it was common practice to tie strips of leather round the hands for protection. In Roman times, this developed into the gladiatorial cestus, with metal added to the gloves to inflict greater damage. The oldest surviving example of boxing gloves date to around AD 120, coming in the form of two non-matching leather bands that were recovered from excavations at the Roman fort of Vindolanda.  The brutality of the sport caused the boxing to be banned in AD 393.

Boxing experienced a revival in Britain around the 17th century. Many bouts were fought with bare knuckles and with no standard rules until Jack Broughton introduced boxing rules known as Broughton's Law in the 18th century, where the gloves were used for practice purposes only. However, many boxers still chose to fight with bare knuckles until 1867 when gloves were mandated by the Marquess of Queensberry Rules.

Modern boxing gloves started showing up towards the end of the 1890s. Over one hundred years of engineering and testing by some of the biggest boxing manufacturers and sport names have helped create safe, durable equipment. Modern boxing gloves include mesh palm, velcro, leather-based stitching, suspension cushioning and new padding for the boxer. The International Boxing Association approves new designs of gloves according to rules around weight and the amount of leather, padding and support allowed.

Features
Boxing gloves usually come with either lace-ups or velcro. In velcro gloves, the velcro acts as a second handwrap that adds more stability to the wrist. Lace-up gloves provide a more snug and secure fit, but unlike velcro gloves, require assistance from another person to lace, and are usually wrapped with tape before the match. Lace-up gloves can be converted to velcro gloves using a hook and loop converter.

Three types of padding commonly used in boxing gloves are horsehair padding, foam padding or a mix of both. Foam padding gloves use latex and PVC foam with shock absorber. Horsehair gloves last longer than foam padding gloves and are environmentally friendly, but are less protective.

In amateur boxing matches, glove color is restricted to red or blue, often with a white "scoring area" at the knuckles to help judges see and record points from a proper punch.

Boxing gloves are worn over hand wraps, which help stabilize the fist area against injuries such as the eponymous boxer's fracture of the fifth metacarpal.

Types of gloves

Safety

The impact of gloves on the injuries caused during a fight is a controversial issue. Hitting to the head was less common in the bare-knuckle era because of the risk of hurting the boxer's hand. Gloves reduce the number of cuts caused, but a report by the British Medical Association concluded that gloves do not reduce brain injuries and may even increase them, because the main cause of injury is acceleration and deceleration of the head, and fighters wearing gloves are able to punch harder to the head. Gloves may reduce the number of eye injuries, especially if they are thumbless, but retinal tears and detached retinas still occur to boxers wearing modern gloves.

One non-peer-reviewed study has estimated the risk of death from bare-knuckle boxing at 14,000 deaths per million participants. This is 184 times more deaths per million participants than for modern professional boxing, which has 76 deaths per million participants (according to the same study). Data for the number of fights and deaths from the bare-knuckle era is incomplete, and there were many differences in rules and medical care. Bare-knuckle boxing matches were usually fought until one fighter could not continue, with bouts sometimes lasting hours, and a few fighters dying after they were carried to their mark to restart the fight when they would otherwise have been unable to continue. (The London Prize Ring Rules later specifically stated that a fighter must "walk to his own side of the scratch unaided" (emphasis added) or lose the fight.) Bare-knuckle rules also allowed grappling and throws, and some deaths were caused by a fighter hitting their head on a stone or rail.

Weighted training gloves
Weighted training gloves are sometimes used in order to add resistance to punching exercises. Such gloves standardly range between one and three kg. As their usage over time typically increases the boxer's strength in that range of movement, they are used to increase the speed and power of a punch; in order to achieve this, their usage may be alternated with normal unweighted punching practice. Care is taken that the muscular adaption for the weight does not impair the normal punching action. Light dumbbells are sometimes used on a similar basis to weighted gloves.

Illegal modification of boxing gloves
On 16 June 1983 at Madison Square Garden, New York City, Luis Resto unexpectedly beat the previously undefeated Billy Collins Jr. An investigation found Resto's gloves had been illegally modified, with padding removed by his trainer, Panama Lewis. As sport journalist Oliver Irish summarized, "Lewis served two years of a six-year prison sentence for assault, conspiracy, tampering with a sports contest and criminal possession of a deadly weapon (Resto's fists)".

Influence of boxing gloves in other fight sports
Open-fingered and open palm MMA gloves or grappling gloves, which are frequently used in mixed martial arts bouts, are not boxing gloves. Similar to the wrist-supporting, closed-thumb, broken-knuckle kempo gloves popularized by Bruce Lee's 1973 movie Enter the Dragon, they provide some padding to the person wearing the glove, but leave the fingers and the palm area open and available for intricate wrestling and grappling maneuvers such as clinch fighting, which are illegal in the sport of modern boxing.

List of boxing competition gloves approved by associations

See also
 Headgear (martial arts)
 MMA gloves

References

External links 
 

Gloves
Martial arts equipment
Protective gear
Sports gloves
Fist-load weapons